Gerald Arkson (born 22 September 1997) is a Ghanaian footballer who plays as a defensive midfielder. He previously played for Liberty Professionals FC and more recently Devrek Belediyespor.

Football career
Arkson began his career by Liberty Prof. U20 and was in January 2015 promoted to the senior squad of Ghana top club Liberty Professionals FC. After four years with Liberty Professionals FC signed on 25 October 2018 with Turkish club Kaynasli Belediyespor.

Early 2019, Arkson completed his half-season move to Turkish lower-tier side Devrek Belediyespor.

Career statistics

Club

Notes

References

External links
 
 

1997 births
Living people
Association football midfielders
Ghanaian footballers
Liberty Professionals F.C. players
Ghana Premier League players